Garh Doul  archaeological site is an important State Protected Monument in Assam, India, situated at Tarajan Kumargaon and about  away from Tezpur, Sonitpur district. The archaeological site is listed as an ASI monument under number S-AS-95. This is fortified in all direction reinforced rampart and covers an area of 250×250 m. The site has two brick mounds, which contains the foundation of brick temple plinths. The remains are datable to 7th and 8th century CE.

Legend
According to the legend constructed by the Brahmin pandits in the Kalika Purana, the fortress was built by the mythical king Banasura to keep his daughter Usha.

Present
The ruins in this place are still undiscovered and the Archaeological Survey Department of Assam is continuing their works and also constructed a park to make it a tourism site in Tezpur.

References

External links

Buildings and structures in Assam
Tourist attractions in Assam
Forts in Assam
Palaces in Assam
Sonitpur district
8th-century establishments in India
Buildings and structures completed in the 8th century